Alfred James Peile (5 August 1868 – 13 July 1948) was a British army officer and amateur malacologist who was an expert on the radulae of gastropods.

Life
Peile was educated at Cheltenham College and trained at the Royal Military Academy, Woolwich. During his military career he served in India, Bermuda and South Africa, as well as in France during the First World War. Following retirement from the army with the rank of lieutenant colonel in 1920, Peile was an honorary curator at the Department of Mollusca at the Natural History Museum in London, and published over fifty malacological papers. He was also President of the Malacological Society of London 1925–1927, and of the Conchological Society 1935–1937.

References

1868 births
1948 deaths
People from London
Royal Artillery officers
English malacologists
People associated with the Natural History Museum, London
Graduates of the Royal Military Academy, Woolwich